Ottawa is a city located at the confluence of the navigable  Illinois River and Fox River in LaSalle County, Illinois, United States. The Illinois River is a conduit for river barges and connects Lake Michigan at Chicago, to the Mississippi River, and North America's 25,000 mile river system. The population estimate was 18,742, as of 2020. It is the county seat of LaSalle County and it is the principal city of the Ottawa, IL Micropolitan Statistical Area.

History

Ottawa occupies a place on the Illinois River that has long been one end of a portage trail between the Mississippi River and Lake Michigan. Here the river was reliably deep enough for canoes. The North Portage Trail connected the site over land and water to the Chicago River.

Ottawa was the site of the first of the Lincoln–Douglas debates on August 21, 1858. During the Ottawa debate, Stephen A. Douglas, leader of the Democratic Party, openly accused Abraham Lincoln of forming a secret bipartisan group of Congressmen to bring about the abolition of slavery.

The John Hossack House was a "station" on the Underground Railroad, and Ottawa was a major stop because of its rail, road, and river transportation. Citizens in the city were active within the abolitionist movement. Ottawa was the site of a famous 1859 extrication of a runaway slave named Jim Gray from a courthouse by prominent civic leaders of the time. Three of the civic leaders, John Hossack, Dr. Joseph Stout and James Stout, later stood trial in Chicago for violating the Fugitive Slave Act of 1850.

Ottawa was also important in the development of the Illinois and Michigan Canal, which terminates in LaSalle, Illinois, 12 miles to the west. In 1838, workmen from the canal project were causing public unrest. During a citizens' meeting, a local political leader, Washington Armstrong, suggested that farmer William Reddick be elected sheriff. Reddick was a popular choice due to his large stature and courageous manner. Reddick was elected by a large majority and held the office of sheriff for four consecutive two-year terms. In 1855, while serving in the Illinois State Senate, Reddick commissioned the construction of a large Italianate house for the then-large sum of $25,000. Reddick Mansion is now one of the largest surviving homes in Illinois to predate the Civil War. In 1973, the mansion was added to the National Register of Historic Places, as part of the Washington Park Historic District.

On February 8, 1910, William Dickson Boyce, then a resident of Ottawa, incorporated the Boy Scouts of America. Five years later, also in Ottawa, Boyce incorporated the Lone Scouts of America. Boyce is buried in Ottawa Avenue Cemetery. The Ottawa Scouting Museum, on Canal Street, opened to the public on December 6, 1997. The museum features the history of Boy Scouting, Girl Scouting and Camp Fire.

In 1922, the Radium Dial Company (RDC) moved from Peru, Illinois to a former high school building in Ottawa. The company employed hundreds of young women who painted watch dials using a paint called "Luna", which contained ionizing radion, for watch maker Westclox. RDC went out of business in 1936, two years after the company's president, Joseph Kelly Sr., left to start a competing company, Luminous Processes Inc., a few blocks away. The employees of the company suffered radiation toxicity, as chronicled in the 1986 documentary, Radium City.

Geography

Climate

Industry

Because of numerous silica sand deposits (Ottawa sand was on board the ill-fated Columbia space shuttle for experimental purposes) Ottawa has been a major sand and glass center for more than 100 years. Transportation of the sand is facilitated by the navigable Illinois river and the Illinois Railway Ottawa Line. One of its largest employers is Pilkington Glass works, a successor to LOF (Libbey Owens Ford). Formerly concentrated in automotive glass, the plant now manufactures specialty glass and underwent a $50 million renovation in 2006. Ottawa sand continues to be extracted from several quarries in the area, and is recognized in glass-making and abrasives for its uniform granularity and characteristics.

Sabic recently purchased GE Plastics, a successor to Borg Warner automotive glass manufacture, operates a large plastics facility in Ottawa, and is a major employer.

Ottawa sand is a standard testing medium in geotechnical engineering (laboratory demonstrations and research into new technologies).

Demographics

As of the 2020 Census, there were 18,840 people, 7,764 households, and 4,658 families living in the city. The racial makeup of the city was 86.4% White, 2.5% African American, 0.4% Native American, 1.0% Asian, 2.5% from other races, and 7.1% from two or more races. Hispanic or Latino of any race were 9.5% of the population.

There were 7,764 households, out of which 27.5% had children under the age of 18 living with them, 39.7% were married couples living together, 15.4% had a female householder with no husband present, and 40.0% were non-families. 34.3% of all households were made up of individuals, and 15.0% had someone living alone who was 65 years of age or older. The average household size was 2.36 and the average family size was 2.93.

The city's age distribution consisted of 24.1% under the age of 18, and 17.1% who were 65 years of age or older. The median age was 39.5 years, and for every 100 females there were 87.2 males.

The median income for a household in the city was $53,544, and the median income for a family was $64,128. Males had a median income of $39,677 versus $26,514 for females. The per capita income for the city was $28,365. There were 13.5% of families and 16.8% of the population living below the poverty line, including 24.9% of those under 18 and 6.5% of those 65 and older.

Tourism

Ottawa has many historic homes and registered historic landmarks. Recent additions to Ottawa have included renovations to its historic mansion, the Reddick Mansion, and artistic murals throughout the central business district. Ottawa is known as the scenic gateway to Starved Rock State Park, the most popular state park in Illinois, with some 2 million visitors per year.  The Fox River, which flows through communities like Elgin and Aurora, empties into the Illinois in downtown Ottawa. Ottawa is also home to one of the largest skydiving operations in the country, Skydive Chicago.

The Ottawa Historical and Scouting Heritage Museum honors Ottawa resident, William D. Boyce, founder of the Boy Scouts of America.

Jacob C. Zeller founded the Zeller Inn and Court Place Tavern in 1871, at 615 Columbus Street. The original Zeller Inn was demolished in 1982. The Zeller Inn tavern, originally known as the Court Place, still remains, now called Zeller Inn. The courtyard patio area on Columbus street is where the original Zeller Inn stood. The tavern contains the original mahogany bar built by the Sanders Bros in Ottawa, marble counters, tiled floors and walls, stained glass door and light fixtures. It also was known for its Gilded Age brilliance — tiled mahogany bar, carved gargoyles, pressed-tin ceiling and solid oak backbar. The mirror on the bar is the same since its establishment in 1871, which was brought over from the 1800s era European Worlds Fair. Zeller's initials, JCZ, are still visible in a tiled mosaic on the side of the bar and in the glass light domes that hang from the ceiling. This is one of the oldest taverns in Illinois, with original features which remain intact and displays the architectural details prominent in the late 1800s.

Media
Ottawa was served by two local newspapers. The older of the two, The Times, was formed in 2005, when the Streator-based Times-Press merged with The Daily Times, based in Ottawa. It is now an online newspaper. The second was a weekly newspaper called Ottawa Delivered, which closed in 2012. Ottawa is also served by the NewsTribune of La Salle, Illinois.

Ottawa also has two local radio stations, WCMY-AM at 1430 and WRKX-FM at 95.3.

Radium City documentary
In 1986, documentary film maker Carole Langer made a film that covered the plight of the so-called "Radium Girls" who worked in the watch dial industry. The young women, who had been told the paint was harmless, ingested deadly amounts of radium after being instructed to lick their paintbrushes to sharpen them; as a lark, some even painted their faces and fingernails with the glowing paint. Over time, many of the women developed anemia, bone fractures, sarcomas, and necrosis of the jaw, a condition now known as radium jaw. Many of these women died young.

The documentary interviews survivors from the industry who relate their experiences of the poisoning and the bureaucratic hurdles they met in seeking compensation and justice. Radium City outlines the aftermath of these events with a focus on the social and political consequences as well as the medical ones.

According to the film, after Radium Dial Company opened in 1918, workers began to get sick, and a lawsuit was brought against the company. With the looming lawsuit, Radium Dial closed in 1936, but then re-opened in 1937, under the name Luminous Processes in another part of town. Luminous Processes remained in operation until 1978.

The film shows the dismantling of the empty building where Luminous Processes was housed as well as the hot spots from where the Radium Dial Company was dismantled and buried throughout the city.  After the plant closed and before it was dismantled, many residents took items from the factory for their homes. This spread the contamination even further. The building materials from the Luminuous Processes building were eventually turned into landfill. The U.S. Environmental Protection Agency began removing contaminated material in 1986. The work continues.

Areas still affected by radiation
Sixteen areas of Ottawa are still radioactive. The United States Department of Health and Human Services released a study, outlining areas where contamination by radium-226 (Ra-226), as well as emissions of radon-222 (Rn-222), are at or above normal levels. These areas include homes, public areas, schools, and even a car sales lot that is housed directly over the old Radium Dial Company site. A score of 28.5/100 or higher qualifies an area for the Superfund National Priority List, and Ottawa's hazardous ranking score is 50/100.

The radium in Ottawa's water supply occurs naturally in water from deep wells across northern Illinois. A reverse osmosis water treatment plant removes the radium so the city's tap water complies with federal regulations.

Notable people

See also

 Fisher–Nash–Griggs House
 Knuessl Building
 Marquette Academy
 Andrew J. O'Conor III House
 Ottawa Commercial Historic District
 Ottawa East Side Historic District
 Ottawa Station (Rock Island Line)
 Ottawa Township High School
 Starved Rock
 Jeremiah Strawn House
 Summit View Cemetery

References

External links

 
 Reddick Public Library
 Ottawa Visitors Center, Ottawa, Illinois

 
1853 establishments in Illinois
Cities in Illinois
Cities in LaSalle County, Illinois
County seats in Illinois
Ottawa, IL Micropolitan Statistical Area
Populated places established in 1853
Populated places on the Underground Railroad